The Italian Mediterranean Buffalo or  is an Italian breed of water buffalo. It is of the River sub-type of water buffalo and is similar to the buffalo breeds of Hungary, Romania and the Balkan countries. It is the only indigenous water buffalo breed in Italy. A herd-book was opened in 1980, and the breed was officially recognised in 2000.

History 

There are conflicting hypotheses concerning the origins of the European water buffalo: one, based on fossil bones found in the valleys of the Elbe and the Rhine, is that it descends from the extinct European wild species Bubalus murrensis; others believe that water buffalo were brought to Europe in the sixth and seventh centuries by invading peoples such as the Pannonian Avars, or later, by crusaders returning from Mesopotamia. Detailed studies of the DNA of European buffalo have not been made.

The buffalo may have been introduced into Italy in Roman times, or during the Barbarian invasions of the Italian peninsula.

The  breed was officially recognised in 2000.

In 1953 the total number of buffalo in Italy was estimated at  head. The numbers of buffalo reported by the Istituto Nazionale di Statistica in 2012 and 2013 were, by region:

Characteristics 

The Mediterranea Italiana is black, with dark slate-grey skin and black hooves. White markings may be present on the head, on the lower legs or on the switch of the tail. Total albinism may occur, but is much less common than in the buffaloes of Asia, where the incidence of albinism is in the range .

Use 

In the past the buffalo was widely used as a draught animal. Buffalo also kept waterways and drainage channels clear of weed, swimming in the deeper parts and wading in the shallows.

The Mediterranea Italiana is now raised and selectively bred principally for the production of the buffalo milk used to make buffalo mozzarella, notably the Mozzarella di Bufala Campana of Campania, which has Denominazione di origine protetta (DOP) status. Other dairy products including burrata, caciotta di bufala, ricotta di bufala, scamorza di bufala, stracchino di bufala, stracciatella di bufala and yoghurt are also made from the milk.

Buffalo are butchered both for fresh meat and for preserved meat products such as bresaola di bufalo. The average carcass yield was 50.6%.

References

Further reading 

 Antonio Borghese (2005). Buffalo Production and Research. REU Technical Series 67. Rome: Food and Agriculture Organization of the United Nations.

Bovines
Mammals of Europe
Water buffalo breeds originating in Italy